The Boss o' Yedden is a novel by Arthur Wright.

References

External links
The Boss o' Yedden at AustLit

1922 Australian novels